Ards Football Club is a semi-professional, Northern Irish football club playing in NIFL Championship. The club is based in Newtownards, but plays its home matches at Clandeboye Park in Bangor, which it rents from rivals Bangor to play home games.  The club colours are red and blue.

History

Castlereagh Park
Ards were forced to sell their Castlereagh Park home in 1998 to try to reduce their crippling debts. The stadium remained well tended for another three years while ambitious plans for a new ground further down the road were developed. In 2002 Castlereagh Park was demolished, as planned. Ards hoped to play at a new community-owned site, a stone's throw from Castlereagh Park that was due to be developed in 2010 by the local council. This plan has since been shelved, and they are still the nomads of Northern Irish football. During the time since Ards left Castleragh Park, they have shared football grounds at Cliftonville's Solitude and Carrick Rangers' Taylors Avenue, their rivals Bangor's ground, Clandeboye Park and Ballyclare Comrades' ground, Dixon Park.

First top-flight return: 2013–14
For the 2012–13 season they played their home games at Clandeboye Park and were promoted to the NIFL Premiership for the 2013–14 season and went straight back down that season..Ards 2014–15 season was a season of change, with many players coming and going from the club and the season ultimately ended in disappointment with them finishing 3rd.
The 2015–16 was a better one with Ards reaching the league cup final by knocking out premiership sides Ballinamallard United and Coleraine before losing 3–0 in the final to Cliftonville at Solitude. Ards kept a comfortable hold at the top of the table before becoming league champions on the last day of the season beating Loughgall to secure their promotion back to the Premiership after a two-year absence.

Second top-flight return: 2016–17
Amidst proposed new plans for a stadium to be built on the grounds of Movilla High School, Ards returned to the top-flight once more under the stewardship of Niall Currie, who sought to bolster his squad with no less than 15 new signings. These included experienced Premiership players such as Ballymena United centre-back Johnny Taylor, and former Glenavon striker Gary Liggett. Other recruitments included defender Stuart McMullan and French striker Guillaume Keke, both signed from Larne. Ards started the season with a credible 2–2 draw with Cliftonville and went on to win their next three games in a row to become early leaders at the top of the league table. Following Niall Currie's move to manage hometown club Portadown the club appointed Glentoran legend Colin Nixon as his replacement.

Londonderry Park
Plans were under-way to develop Londonderry Park as the new grounds for the team. Planning officials gave Ards Borough Council the go-ahead on the £3.8 million plan in October 2010.

In 2009, supporters launched a campaign, 'Bring Ards FC Home', in which they publicised the need in the media and had discussions with politicians. Back as far as November 2008, the Council had discussed the need for a new Ards stadium. It was decided in April 2009 that Londonderry Park, on the Portaferry Road in Newtownards, was the best option and the Ards Council accepted the tender for redevelopment of the site in September 2010. Plans included upgrades to the existing grass surfaces and the addition of new synthetic surfaces, and to allow for the possibility of future upgrading to meet regulations should the need arise. The ground would have also continued to provide facilities for hockey and cricket.

However, in August 2012 it was announced that Ards Borough Council would not be proceeding with the new stadium, and the plans were shelved.

European record

Overview

Matches

Current squad

Non-playing staff
Chairman: Warren Patton
Treasurer: Jim Bailie
Company secretary:  John Heron
Club Secretary, Andrew Rodgers 
Manager: Matthew Tipton
Assistant Manager: David Miskelly
First-team: Coach:
First-team Physiotherapist:Sam Lewis
First-team Attendant:Peter Bloomer
First-team Attendant: Barry Edgar
Football Secretary: Andrew Rodgers 
Directors: Warren Patton, (Chair), Stephen Wilton (Vice-Chair), Jim Bailie (Treasurer), Timmy Clarke,  Gary Anderson, Stuart Dellow, John Heron, David Armstrong
PA Announcer: Ivor Edgar
Website Editor: Michael Barritt
Programme Editor: Adrian Monaghan
Rep. to NIFL Premiership: Brian Adams
Rep. to Irish Football Association: Brian Adams
Vice President Billy Humphries

Managerial history

Honours

Senior honours
Irish League (tier 1): 1
1957–58
Irish League First Division (tier 2): 4
2000–01, 2010–11, 2012–13, 2015–16
Irish Cup: 4
1926–27, 1951–52, 1968–69, 1973–74
Irish League Cup: 1
1994–95
Gold Cup: 2
1953–54, 1973–74
Ulster Cup: 1
1973–74
Blaxnit Cup: 1
1973–74
County Antrim Shield: 3
1955–56, 1971–72, 1993–94

Intermediate honours
Irish League B Division/IFA Championship 1: 3
1957–58†, 2012–13, 2015–16
Irish Intermediate Cup: 1
1970–71†
Steel & Sons Cup: 1
2008–09
George Wilson Cup: 2
1957–58†, 1982–83†
 McElroy Cup: 1
1940–41†

† Won by Ards II (reserve team)

International players
Number of caps listed are those gained whilst contracted to Ards FC.
Andy Bothwell, 5 caps (Northern Ireland), 1925–27
Tommy Forde, 4 caps (Northern Ireland), 1958–60
Billy Humphries, 14 caps(Northern Ireland), 1962
Paul Kee, 2 caps (Northern Ireland), 1994

References

External links
 Ards FC Website
 Ards Statistics and Results at the Irish Football Club Project

 
Association football clubs established in 1900
Association football clubs in Northern Ireland
Newtownards
Association football clubs in County Down
1900 establishments in Ireland